The Islamic City Council of Shiraz is the directly elected council that presides over the city of Shiraz and elects the mayor in a mayor–council government system.

Members

References

External links
 

Shiraz
Shiraz
1999 establishments in Iran